Philip Sidney (1554–1586) was an English poet, courtier and soldier.

Philip Sidney may also refer to:

 Philip Sidney, 3rd Earl of Leicester (1619–1698), son of Robert Sidney, 2nd Earl of Leicester
 Philip Sidney, 5th Earl of Leicester (1676–1705), British peer and Member of Parliament for Kent
 Philip Sidney, 1st Baron De L'Isle and Dudley (1800–1851), British Tory politician
 Philip Sidney, 2nd Baron De L'Isle and Dudley (1828–1898)
 Philip Sidney, 3rd Baron De L'Isle and Dudley (1853–1922)
 Philip Sidney, 2nd Viscount De L'Isle (born 1945), British peer and former soldier

See also
Sir Philip Sidney game
Sir Philip Sydney Jones (1836–1918), Australian medical practitioner